The Big Country is a Western novel by Donald Hamilton, Originally serialized in The Saturday Evening Post as Ambush at Blanco Canyon. Published two years prior to Hamilton's Death of a Citizen, which launched his popular Matt Helm series, it explores many of the same themes of self-reliance that dominated the author's work.

Plot summary
Maryland sea captain James McKay goes west to Texas, to claim his bride, and steps into a violent feud over water.

Film adaptation

Filmed in 1958 starring Gregory Peck, Jean Simmons, Carroll Baker, Charlton Heston, Charles Bickford, Burl Ives and Chuck Connors.

The film adaptation was mostly faithful to the plot of the novel, while simplifying the story and eliminating some characters.

Comic book adaptation
The Big Country comics

Publication history
1957, US, The Saturday Evening Post, as Ambush at Blanco Canyon, 2/2/1957, 2/9/1957, 2/16/1957, 2/23/1957, serial (literature)
1958, US, Dell, Dell First Edition B115, paperback, reissued many times
1958, US, Dell Comics, Dell Four Color #946, comic
1958, UK, Allan Wingate, hardcover

1958 American novels
Western (genre) novels
Novels by Donald Hamilton
Novels set in Texas
American novels adapted into films
Novels adapted into comics
Novels first published in serial form